Robert Harvey (born 21 May 1983) is an English singer, musician, DJ and songwriter. He is the lead singer and rhythm guitarist of The Music and has since written hits such as "Real Love" for Clean Bandit/Jess Glynne, "Lonely" for Joel Corry (and Harlee) and "Head and Heart" for Joel Corry/MNEK. In 2021 he joined Kasabian as a touring vocalist and multi-instrumentalist.

Music career

2001–2011: The Music 
Harvey formed The Music with close friends Adam Nutter, Stuart Coleman and Phil Jordan in 2001. Their first single "Take the Long Road and Walk It" peaked at 14 on the UK Singles Chart, which saw them perform live on Top of the Pops.

The Music (2002) 
The group's self-titled debut album was released on Hut Records and Capitol Records and peaked at number 4 on the UK Albums Chart. It was produced by Jim Abbiss. The album was known for its circular artwork by Rob and Nick Carter. Singles "Take the Long Road and Walk It" and "The Truth Is No Words" went top 20 on the UK Singles Chart. The band toured with New Order, The Charlatans and Oasis, as well as selling out Blackpool Empress Ballroom and London's Brixton Academy.

Welcome to the North (2004) 
The band's second studio album peaked at number 8 on the UK Albums Chart and had two top 20 singles with "Freedom Fighters" and "Breakin'". The album was produced by Brendan O'Brien. They supported Coldplay, Incubus and U2 as well as sold-out tours of their own in the UK, Japan and Australia.

Strength in Numbers (2008) 
Strength in Numbers was The Music's final album and was released in 2008 on Polydor and peaked at number 19 on the UK Albums Chart. Strength in Numbers was produced by Flood and Paul Hartnol.

2011–2012: The Streets 
Harvey wrote on two songs and performed on three from Computers and Blues. The album peaked at number 8 on the UK Albums Chart. Mike Skinner asked Harvey to join him on tour as the guitarist/singer which saw The Streets headline shows and festivals across the UK and Europe.

2012–2014: The D.O.T. 
The D.O.T. saw Harvey and Mike Skinner experimenting with sound and video and saw the band travel to Japan for shows.

2014: The Six 
The Six are a Manchester collective brought together by Harvey and Rick Boardman (Delphic). The Six featured on "Take It All" by Gorgon City. Harvey co-wrote "Real Love" by Clean Bandit and Jess Glynne, which peaked at number 2 on the UK Singles Chart and number 2 in Germany. The Six then worked in the studio with MNEK, Rudimental and Lily Allen. In late 2014 The Six supported Gorgon City on tour.

2021: Kasabian 
On 27 September 2021, it was reported by the Daily Mirror that Harvey would be joining Kasabian for their forthcoming tour, following the departure of former frontman Tom Meighan in 2020.

Discography

Songwriting and production credits

References 

Living people
1983 births
People from Kippax, West Yorkshire
English rock singers
English male singers
Musicians from Leeds